Nimpo Lake is a four-season outdoor—tourism and ranching unincorporated community in the West Chilcotin of the Cariboo Chilcotin Coast region;    
via the B.C. Highway #20 from the Central Interior of British Columbia, Canada.  Nimpo Lake is also the home base of the "B.C. Floatplane Association".

References
BCGNIS listing "Nimpo Lake (community)"

Unincorporated settlements in British Columbia
Populated places in the Chilcotin
Tsilhqot'in communities